Christopher John Smith, FSA (Scot), FRHistS, FSA, FRSA (born 1965 in Aylesbury, England) is a British academic and classicist specialising in early Ancient Rome. He is Professor of Ancient History at the University of St Andrews and was formerly Director of the British School at Rome. From 1 September 2020 he is on secondment to the Arts and Humanities Research Council as Executive Chair.

Early life
Smith was born in Aylesbury, England in 1965. He attended Aylesbury Grammar School then Keble College, University of Oxford to read a Bachelor of Arts in Literae Humaniores, graduating in 1988. He holds a DPhil also from  Keble College awarded in 1992.

Academic career
His research explores constitutionalism and state formation with particular emphasis on the development of Rome as a political and social community and how this was represented in ancient historical writing and subsequent political thought.

He joined the University of St Andrews in 1992 as a Lecturer in Ancient History and was appointed to a chair in 2002.

He was Proctor & Provost of St Leonard's College, University of St Andrews.

He served as President of the Unione internazionale degli istituti di archeologia Storia e Storia dell’Arte in Rome from 2012 to 2017.

In 2017 he was awarded a three-year Leverhulme Trust Major Research Grant. to study Rome's early kings. He is foreign member to the Istituto Nazionale di Studi Etruschi ed Italici in Florence.

Selected publications & awards
Among his publications are:
Early Rome and Latium: Economy and Society c. 1000 to 500 BC Oxford : Clarendon Press ; New York : Oxford University Press, 1996. .
The Roman Clan: The Gens from Ancient Ideology to Modern Anthropology.Cambridge ; New York : Cambridge University Press, 2006. .    
Christopher John Smith; Anton Powell; Tim Cornell, eds. The lost memoirs of Augustus and the development of Roman autobiography. Swansea [Wales]: Classical Press of Wales; Oakville, CT: Distributor in the United States of America, David Brown Book Co., 2009. .
CJ Smith, RJ Covino (eds). Praise and Blame in Roman Republican Oratory. Swansea : Classical Press of Wales ; Oakville, CT : Distributor in the United States of America, David Brown Book Co., 2011. .
Peter Derow; Christopher John Smith; Liv Mariah Yarrow, eds. Imperialism, Cultural Politics, and Polybius. Oxford ; New York : Oxford University Press, 2012. .

Awarded Premio Cultori di Roma 2017 by the Istituto Nazionale di Studi Romani

References

Living people
Alumni of Keble College, Oxford
Academics of the University of St Andrews
Classical scholars of the University of St Andrews
Historians of antiquity
Fellows of the Royal Historical Society
Fellows of the Society of Antiquaries of London
People from Aylesbury
People educated at Aylesbury Grammar School
British classical scholars
1965 births
Fellows of the Society of Antiquaries of Scotland